This is a list of flag bearers who have represented Syria at the Olympics.

Flag bearers carry the national flag of their country at the opening ceremony of the Olympic Games.

See also
Syria at the Olympics

References

Syria at the Olympics
Syria
Olympic flagbearers
Olympics